Elections for the House of Representatives of the Philippines were held on April 23, 1946. Held on the same day as the presidential election, it was held after the Nacionalista Party had split permanently into two factions: the "conservative" faction headed by president Sergio Osmeña and the "liberal" faction headed by Senate president Manuel Roxas, which later became the Liberal Party. Roxas and the Liberals won the elections, leaving the Nacionalistas with the minority in both houses of Congress.

Candidates from the leftist Democratic Alliance won six seats in the House of Representatives but were not allowed to take their seats on grounds of fraud and violent campaign tactics during the election.  Five of them were later restored their seats but only after a constitution amendment concerning parity rights to U.S. citizens was approved.  That approval was required by the Bell Trade Act of the United States Congress and led to the 1947 Philippine Parity Rights plebiscite to amend the 1935 Constitution of the Philippines.

Results

See also
2nd Congress of the Commonwealth of the Philippines

References

  

1946
History of the Philippines (1898–1946)
1946 elections in the Philippines